Madonna and Child is a c.1475 tempera on panel painting by Giovanni Bellini, now in the Museo di Castelvecchio in Verona. It measures 77 cm by 57 cm.

Verona
1475 paintings